The 2019 CircuitCity.com 250 is a NASCAR Xfinity Series race held on June 16, 2019, at Iowa Speedway in Newton, Iowa. Contested over 250 laps on the  D-shaped oval, it was the 14th race of the 2019 NASCAR Xfinity Series season.

Background

Track

The track was designed with influence from Rusty Wallace and patterned after Richmond Raceway, a short track where Wallace was very successful. It has over 25,000 permanent seats as well as a unique multi-tiered Recreational Vehicle viewing area along the backstretch.

Entry list

Practice

Qualifying

Qualifying results

Race

Summary
Cole Custer began on pole. He remained on the outside lane and pulled away. On lap 30, David Starr lost a motor and brought out the caution. On the restart, Custer got ahead on the top, with Christopher Bell contesting him on the bottom. Custer held the lead as Justin Allgaier chased after them.

Joey Gase and Vinnie Miller tangled on lap 48, wrecking their cars and bringing out the caution. Custer wins the race off pit road. Justin Haley took the lead as Custer and Bell quickly caught up to him. Bell used a sidedraft and slid in front of Custer to win Stage 1.

Custer and Bell continue their fight for the lead, with Allgaier behind them. With three laps remaining in stage 2, Austin Cindric and Allgaier made contact. Cindric thought he was clear, Allgaier still had a fender on him on the outside. Bell won Stage 2. He also built up a strong lead afterwards, staying in the lead after a caution caused by Tyler Matthews.

On the next restart, Bell gets ahead of Custer, who in turn blocked Allgaier from passing. With 35 laps remaining, Custer got into the wall with no damage, bringing out the caution. He manages to get off pit road first. With 27 laps remaining, Custer got loose, prompting Bell to go to the bottom. Bell makes contact while trying to side draft, but he leads into the next turn. With 16 laps remaining, Chad Finchum brought out the caution after slamming into the wall.

On the restart, Custer went to the bottom, but Bell got ahead on the top. Custer pulled next to him off the next turn, but Bell drove away and took the win for the race.

Stage Results

Stage One
Laps: 60

Stage Two
Laps: 60

Final Stage Results

Stage Three
Laps: 130

References

2019 in sports in Iowa
LTi Printing 250
NASCAR races at Iowa Speedway
2019 NASCAR Xfinity Series